Shrek SuperSlam is a fighting video game featuring characters from the Shrek film series. It was developed by Shaba Games, published by Activision and released in the fall of 2005 for the Xbox, PlayStation 2, GameCube, Nintendo DS and Game Boy Advance, with a Microsoft Windows port following shortly after. Up to four players can participate in battle using various characters from the first two Shrek films, along with some original characters like Luna the witch, the Black Knight, Quasimodo, and Humpty Dumpty (the latter of which later appeared in the standalone Puss in Boots film in 2011).

Plot
The main plot focuses on Shrek and his friends attempting to help Donkey put the Dronkeys to sleep in order to watch Survivor: Sherwood Forest together at the Dragon's Keep.  When one of the Dronkeys inadvertently destroys the family's storybook, the group takes turns creating their own stories.  After telling enough stories, the Dronkeys do fall asleep only to be woken up after Shrek yells at the game's announcer for talking too much in the epilogue.

Overview
Shrek SuperSlam is a 3D-environment multiplayer fighting game in which two to four fighter characters battle in a variety of arena stages attempting to beat each other up and charge a special move called a "Slam" attack.  When a "Slam" is successfully used on other fighters, the player gains points while continually (and creatively) destroying the arena in the process.  Whoever gains the most "Slam" points will win when the round is over.

Gameplay
The game features three multiplayer modes: "Melee", "King of the Hill", and "Slammageddon".

In "Melee", the objective is to earn as many slam points within a two-minute time period. For attack, a word bank that says "Slam" will fill up. Once the bank has filled up, the player can unleash a Slam Attack which can hit multiple opponents. For each opponent who's hit, the player will receive a Slam Point, but if a player get slammed, they'll lose one. The player with the most slam points after the time limit stops wins.

In "King of the Hill", the object of the game is to stay atop of a hill the longest, while opponents try and knock each other off. The first player to reach 30 points wins. The longer the player stays on the hill, the more points she/he will receive.

In "Slammageddon", each single attack counts as a Slam.

Every character's "Slam" attack have different effects and range. For example, Shrek's "Green Storm" attack will send his opponents flying as he undergoes flatulence at close range, while Robin Hood's "Arrow Swarm" has him commanding his band of Merry Men to litter the battlefield in raining arrows from the sky.  Other examples include Pinocchio's "Buzz Bomber" in which his nose grows and he flies across the arena at opponents or Fiona Ogre uses "Ogre Aria" to blast her enemies with floating projectile singing notes.

Characters
The game features 20 playable characters total, with 10 of these needing to be unlocked through gameplay progression.  Each character has an array of various costumes/skins to change their appearance.  Most of the characters have their own distinct fighting style and moves, with only one or two characters being very similar "clone fighters".

 Anthrax 
 Black Knight
 Captain Hook 
 Cyclops 
 Donkey
 Dronkey 
 Fiona 
 Fiona Ogre 
 Gingerbread Man 
 G-Nome 
 Huff N' Puff Wolf 
 Humpty Dumpty  
 Luna (Lil' Witch in GBA/DS versions) 
 Shrek 
 Pinocchio 
 Prince Charming
 Puss in Boots 
 Quasimodo 
 Red Riding Hood
 Robin Hood 

 Unlockable characters 
 Characters with alternate costumes 

John Kassir voices the game's announcer. Mongo the Giant Gingerbread Man (voiced by Conrad Vernon) appears as part of a moving stage in the game. In the Game Boy Advance port of the game, Doris the ugly stepsister is an exclusive playable character. In the Nintendo DS port of the game, Thelonious and a Knight are exclusive playable characters.

Reception

Shrek SuperSlam was met with "mixed or average" reviews. GameRankings and Metacritic gave it a score of 74% and 71 out of 100 for the Xbox version; 74% and 70 out of 100 for the GameCube version; 70% and 69 out of 100 for the PC version; 69% and 67 out of 100 for the PlayStation 2 version; 59% and 56 out of 100 for the DS version; and 52% and 58 out of 100 for the Game Boy Advance version.

References

External links
Official website
Activision page

Shrek video games
2005 video games
Fighting games
Platform fighters
3D fighting games
Cooperative video games
GameCube games
Game Boy Advance games
Nintendo DS games
PlayStation 2 games
PlayStation Portable games
Video games scored by Kevin Manthei
Xbox games
Windows games
Multiplayer and single-player video games
Activision games
Video games using Havok
Big Bad Wolf
Video games developed in the United States
Amaze Entertainment games